The Hawaiian Organic Act, was an organic act enacted by the United States Congress to establish the Territory of Hawaii and to provide a Constitution and government for the territory. The Act was replaced by the Hawaii Admission Act on August 21, 1959, when the territory was admitted to the Union as the State of Hawaii.

Background
The Island of Hawaii was first inhabited by Polynesians who arrived in canoes and spread to the other Hawaiian islands. After contact by British explorer James Cook during his third voyage (1776–1780), the islands became well known and Europeans came and inhabited them. The French government was interested in the islands and wanted to establish Catholicism. The Kingdom of Hawaii became more influenced by the United States which set up trade relations with the Kingdom. After the overthrow of the Hawaiian Kingdom in 1893, the new Republic of Hawaii government lobbied for annexation by the United States. Annexation was approved by President William McKinley and Hawaii was incorporated as part of the territory of the United States on August 12, 1898, and then, in April 1900, organized as the territory of Hawaii.

General provisions

Capital 
The Act stated that Honolulu, on Oahu, would be the capital of the Territory of Hawaii.

Citizenship 
The Act stated that any person who was a citizen of the Republic of Hawaii on or before August 12, 1898 would also be a citizen of the United States, and any citizen of the United States who resided in the islands on or after August 12, 1898 would have to live there to become a citizen of the Territory of Hawaii.

Abolished offices 
Certain offices that the Republic of Hawaii once supported would be abolished and replaced. For example, president, minister of foreign affairs, minister of the interior, minister of finance, minister of public instruction, auditor-general, deputy auditor-general, surveyor-general, marshal, and deputy marshal of the Republic of Hawaii.

Legislature of Hawaii

Laws 
All laws in effect in the Republic of Hawaii would continue. Suits would be under the name of the Territory of Hawaii. Finally, the act stated that any contracts made after August 12, 1898 would be nullified and terminated since they would no longer be legally binding according to the United States Congress.

Section 67 of the Act came under U.S. Supreme Court reference during World War II with regard to what martial law actually allowed, and more specifically, whether civilians could be tried by military courts. Section 67 derived from Article 31 of the Constitution of the Republic of Hawaii (1895), was suited for disloyal subjects at odds with the annexation; demonstrating how quickly political situations can change.

Elections 
Elections would be held on the second Tuesday of November, but the governor could make a special request 30 days in advance for an earlier election.

Corruption 
An office holder who takes bribes and subdues to any type of corruption will have voting rights repealed and will no longer be allowed to run for any governmental office, unless they are pardoned and civil rights are restored.

Civilian punishment against a Member of the House 
If a person from either the Hawaii House of Representatives or Hawaii Senate is assaulted, detained or harmed, the offenders will be fined or detained for a maximum of 30 days. This also applies if the person violates or threatens any member of any house.

Member's salary 
Members of either house will be paid $1000 for each general session to which they attend. [Congress] is responsible for such payments from the United States Treasury. A bonus will be paid to any member who travels any distance for their general session of 20 cents per mile. A final bonus of $500 will be paid to any member who wishes to participate in any special session.

Punishments and privileges of legislative members 
Any member of the Senate or House of Representatives found guilty disorderly behavior or neglect of duty can be censured or impeached. Any member can be pardoned for any words that he may have said during a general session. Any member can also be pardoned of any crime while he is away on their respective house sessions, unless the crime includes any form of treason, felony, or breach of peace.

Hawaii Senate

Establishing the Senate 
The Senate had 25 members, having a four-year term. When a member of the Senate dies or resigns, a special election or a general election will appoint a new member to replace him.

Senatorial districts 

The United States Senate created six senatorial districts:
First District – The part of the Island of Hawaii known as Puna, Hilo, and Hāmākua.
Second District – The second district consist of Kaū, Kona, and Kohala. 
Third District – The islands of Maui, Molokai, Lānai, Kahoolawe.
Fourth District – Part of the island of Oahu, lying east and south of Nuuanu Street and Pali Road. The upper ridge of the Koolau Range from the Nuuanu Pali to Makapuu Point.    
Fifth District – The rest of Oahu island. 
Sixth District – The islands of Kauai and Niihau.

Requirements for Senator 

A senator of the Hawaiian Islands must be a citizen of the United States, must be at least 30 years old, and must have lived in Hawaii for at least three years. The original text, written in 1900, requires that a senator must "be a male citizen of the United States;" this gender requirement stood until 1922.

Hawaii House of Representatives

Establishing the House of Representatives

The house of representatives will hold 51 members who shall be elected from their representative district, the member will then be active until the following general election. In case a vacancy opens then a special election will be held to fill in that vacancy.

Representative districts
The government of the United States has chosen to establish 18 representative districts which are as follows:

First District – Part of the island of Hawaii known as Puna; One representative 
Second District – The portion of the island known as South Hilo; Four representatives
Third District – North Hilo and Hāmākua; One representative 
Fourth District – Kaū, South Kona, and a portion of North Kona known as Keauhou; One representative
Fifth District – Kohala and the rest of North Kona that was not stated in the fourth district; One representative
Sixth District–  Islands of Molokai and Lānai; One representative
Seventh District – The islands of Maui and Kahoolawe; Five representatives 
Eight District – The segment of the island Oahu known as Koolaupoko and Koolauloa; Two representatives
Ninth District – Another portion of the island of Oahu known as Waialua and Wahiawa; Two representatives
Tenth District – The portion of Oahu known as Ewa and Waianae; Two representatives
Eleventh District – The portion of Oahu known as Kalihi; Three representatives
Twelfth District–  The part of Oahu known as Upper Nuuanu; Three representatives 
Thirteenth District – The part of Oahu known as Kapalama; Three representatives
Fourteenth District – The part of Oahu known as Pauoa; Five representatives
Fifteenth District – Portions of the island of Oahu  known as Mānoa and Waikīkī; Six representatives
Sixteenth District – Parts of island of Oahu known as Kaimuki and Kapahulu; Four representatives  
Seventeenth District – The rest of the island of Oahu; Three representatives
Eighteenth District – The islands of Kauai and Niihau; Four representatives

Requirements to be in House of Representatives
Candidates to the House of Representatives must be 25 years of age, a citizen of the United States, and lived in Hawaii for at least three years. The original text, written in 1900, requires that a senator must "be a male citizen of the United States;" this gender requirement stood until 1922.

See also 
Hawaii Admission Act
Territory of Hawaii

References

External links 

Organic Act
Organic Act
Organic Act
1900 in American law
1900 in Hawaii